Aeolanthes haematopa is a moth in the family Depressariidae. It was described by Edward Meyrick in 1931. It is found in China.

References

Moths described in 1931
Aeolanthinae